The Morgan County School District is a public school district in Morgan County, Georgia, United States, based in Madison. It serves the communities of Bostwick, Buckhead, Madison, and Rutledge.

Schools
The Morgan County School District has two elementary schools, one high school, and one alternative school.

Elementary schools
Morgan County Elementary School
Morgan County Primary School

Middle school
Morgan County Middle School

High school
Morgan County High School

Alternative school
Morgan County Crossroads School

References

External links

School districts in Georgia (U.S. state)
Education in Morgan County, Georgia